William H. Jones Jr. (1842 - ?) was a teacher, judge, colonel in the state militia, election commissioner, and state legislator in South Carolina. He represented Georgetown County, South Carolina in the South Carolina House of Representatives from 1868 to 1872. He served in the South Carolina Senate from 1872 to 1876.

He was born in and grew up in Philadelphia. He had an intense rivalry with fellow legislator James A. Bowley, who was also African American.

References

1842 births
Year of death missing
Members of the South Carolina House of Representatives
South Carolina state senators
African-American state legislators in South Carolina